William W. Galt may refer to:
 William Wylie Galt (1919–1944), United States Army officer and Medal of Honor recipient
 William W. Galt (politician) (1854–1945), American farmer and politician in Minnesota